The Brute Master is a 1920 American silent drama film directed by Roy Marshall and starring Hobart Bosworth, Anna Q. Nilsson and William Conklin.

Cast
 Hobart Bosworth as Bucko McAllister, The Brute Master
 Anna Q. Nilsson as Madeline Grey
 William Conklin as Walter Maxwell
 Margaret Livingston as The Native 'Taupou'

References

Bibliography
 Taves, Brian. Thomas Ince: Hollywood's Independent Pioneer. University Press of Kentucky, 2012.

External links
 

1920 films
1920 drama films
1920s English-language films
American silent feature films
Silent American drama films
American black-and-white films
Films distributed by W. W. Hodkinson Corporation
1920s American films